In mathematics, more specifically in the field of ring theory, a ring has the invariant basis number (IBN) property if all finitely generated free left modules over R have a well-defined rank. In the case of fields, the IBN property becomes the statement that finite-dimensional vector spaces have a unique dimension.

Definition
A ring R has invariant basis number (IBN) if for all positive integers m and n, Rm isomorphic to Rn (as left R-modules) implies that .

Equivalently, this means there do not exist distinct positive integers m and n such that Rm is isomorphic to Rn.

This form reveals that the definition is left–right symmetric, so it makes no difference whether we define IBN in terms of left or right modules; the two definitions are equivalent.

Note that the isomorphisms in the definitions are not ring isomorphisms, they are module isomorphisms, even when one of n or m is 1.

Properties
The main purpose of the invariant basis number condition is that free modules over an IBN ring satisfy an analogue of the dimension theorem for vector spaces: any two bases for a free module over an IBN ring have the same cardinality.  Assuming the ultrafilter lemma (a strictly weaker form of the axiom of choice), this result is actually equivalent to the definition given here, and can be taken as an alternative definition.

The rank of a free module Rn over an IBN ring R is defined to be the cardinality of the exponent m of any (and therefore every) R-module Rm isomorphic to Rn.  Thus the IBN property asserts that every isomorphism class of free R-modules has a unique rank.  The rank is not defined for rings not satisfying IBN.  For vector spaces, the rank is also called the dimension.  Thus the result above is in short: the rank is uniquely defined for all free R-modules iff it is uniquely defined for finitely generated free R-modules.

Examples
Any field satisfies IBN, and this amounts to the fact that finite-dimensional vector spaces have a well defined dimension.  Moreover, any commutative ring (except the zero ring) satisfies IBN, as does any left-Noetherian ring and any semilocal ring.

Let A be a commutative ring and assume there exists an A-module isomorphism . Let  the canonical basis of An, which means  is all zeros except a one in the i-th position. An A-module morphism means

because I is an ideal. So f induces an A/I-module morphism , that can easily be proven to be an isomorphism. Since A/I is a field, f''' is an isomorphism between finite dimensional vector spaces, so .

That last requirement allows us to define the product of infinite matrices MN, giving the ring structure. A left module isomorphism  is given by:

From this isomorphism, it is possible to show (abbreviating ) that  for any positive integer n, and hence  for any two positive integers m and n''.

Other results
IBN is a necessary (but not sufficient) condition for a ring with no zero divisors to be embeddable in a division ring (confer field of fractions in the commutative case).  See also the Ore condition.

Every nontrivial division ring or stably finite ring has invariant basis number.

References

Sources
 

  Reprint of the 1974 original

Module theory
Commutative algebra
Ring theory
Homological algebra